Pedro António Coelho Moreira (born 23 October 1983) is a Portuguese former professional footballer who played as a right-back.

Club career
Moreira was born in Penafiel, Porto District. He spent his entire 18-year senior career with F.C. Penafiel and S.C. Beira-Mar.

Over five seasons, Moreira appeared in 115 Primeira Liga games. He retired in 2019 at the age of 35, with Beira-Mar now in the Aveiro regional divisions due to financial problems; the captain was at one point the player with the most appearances for the club.

References

External links

1983 births
Living people
People from Penafiel
Sportspeople from Porto District
Portuguese footballers
Association football defenders
Primeira Liga players
Liga Portugal 2 players
Segunda Divisão players
F.C. Penafiel players
S.C. Beira-Mar players